Senowkesh is a village in Sarajuy-ye Gharbi Rural District, in the Central District of Maragheh County, East Azerbaijan Province, Iran. At the 2006 census, its population was 808, in 202 families.

References 

Towns and villages in Maragheh County